Entertainment and Sports Lawyer is a law review published by the Forum on the Entertainment and Sports Industries of the American Bar Association. It is aimed at lawyers who specialize in entertainment and sports.

American law journals
English-language journals
Publications with year of establishment missing
Entertainment law journals